Around 65 species of crab occur in the waters of the British Isles. All are marine, with the exception of the introduced Chinese mitten crab, Eriocheir sinensis, which occurs in fresh and brackish water.

Fisheries

Several species of wild crab are the subject of crab fisheries around the coasts of the British Isles. The most important are the brown crab or edible crab, Cancer pagurus (29,193 t), various swimming crabs (3,180 t), the spider crab Maja brachydactyla (1,565 t), the shore crab or green crab Carcinus maenas (553 t) and the velvet crab Necora puber (193 t). Around 77% of the catch is landed in the United Kingdom, 19% in Ireland, 4% in the Channel Islands, and 1% in the Isle of Man.

Species
62 species have been directly observed in the waters of the British Isles:

Dromiidae
Dromia personata (Linnaeus, 1758)
Homolidae
Paromola cuvieri (Risso, 1816)

Leucosiidae
Ebalia cranchii Leach, 1817
Ebalia granulosa H. Milne-Edwards, 1837
Ebalia nux A. Milne-Edwards, 1883
Ebalia tuberosa (Pennant, 1777)
Ebalia tumefacta (Montagu, 1808)
Majidae
Maja brachydactyla Balss, 1922
Eurynome aspera (Pennant, 1777)
Eurynome spinosa Hailstone, 1835
Oregoniidae
Hyas araneus (Linnaeus, 1758)
Hyas coarctatus Leach, 1815
Inachidae
Achaeus cranchii Leach, 1817
Inachus dorsettensis (Pennant, 1777)
Inachus leptochirus Leach, 1817
Inachus phalangium (Fabricius, 1775)
Macropodia deflexa Forest, 1978
Macropodia linaresi Forest & Zariquiey Alvarez, 1964
Macropodia rostrata (Linnaeus, 1761)
Macropoda tenuirostris (Leach, 1814)
Epialtidae
Pisa armata (Latreille, 1803)
Pisa tetraodon (Pennant, 1777)
Parthenopidae
Parthenopides massena (Roux, 1830)
Corystidae
Corystes cassivelaunus (Pennant, 1777)
Atelecyclidae
Atelecyclus rotundatus (Olivi, 1792)
Atelecyclus undecimdentatus (Herbst, 1783)
Thiidae
Thia scutellata (Fabricius, 1793)
Pirimelidae
Pirimela denticulata (Montagu, 1808)
Cancridae
Cancer bellianus Johnson, 1861
Cancer pagurus Linnaeus, 1758
Portunidae
Callinectes sapidus Rathbun, 1896
Carcinus maenas (Linnaeus, 1758)
Bathynectes longipes (Risso, 1816)
Bathynectes maravigna (Prestandrea, 1839)
Liocarcinus corrugatus (Pennant, 1777)
Liocarcinus depurator (Linnaeus, 1758)
Liocarcinus holsatus (Fabricius, 1798)
Liocarcinus marmoreus (Leach, 1814)
Liocarcinus navigator (Herbst, 1794)
Liocarcinus pusillus (Leach, 1815)
Liocarcinus zariquieyi Gordon, 1968
Macropipus tuberculatus (Roux, 1830)
Necora puber (Linnaeus, 1767)
Polybius henslowii Leach, 1820
Portumnus latipes (Pennant, 1777)
Xaiva biguttata (Risso, 1816)
Geryonidae
Geryon trispinosus (Herbst, 1803)
Goneplacidae
Goneplax rhomboides (Linnaeus, 1758)
Xanthidae
Monodaeus couchi (Couch, 1851)
Xantho hydrophilus (Herbst, 1790)
Xantho pilipes A. Milne-Edwards, 1867
Panopeidae
Dyspanopeus sayi (S. I. Smith, 1869)
Rhithropanopeus harrisii (Gould, 1841)
Pilumnoididae
Pilumnoides inglei Guinot & Macpherson, 1987
Pilumnidae
Pilumnus hirtellus (Linnaeus, 1761)

Grapsidae
Pachygrapsus marmoratus (Fabricius, 1787)
Planes minutus (Linnaeus, 1758)
Varunidae
Brachynotus sexdentatus (Risso, 1827)
Eriocheir sinensis H. Milne-Edwards, 1853
Asthenognathus atlanticus Monod, 1933
Pinnotheridae
Nepinnotheres pinnotheres (Linnaeus, 1758)
Pinnotheres pisum (Linnaeus, 1767)

Three deep-water species have also been recorded near the British Isles, and are likely to occur in the area. These are:
Cymonomus granulatus (Norman in Wyville Thomson, 1873) (Cymonomidae)
Dorhynchus thomsoni Wyville Thomson, 1873 (Inachidae)
Rochinia carpenteri (Wyville Thomson, 1873) (Epialtidae)

Notes

References

Crabs
Fauna of the British Isles